The Greening of Detroit is an urban forestry program and non-profit partner in The Detroit Partnership; it was founded in 1989. In addition to planting trees in the Detroit area, the organization engages in urban forestry education, job training, and other community programs. In 2011, Greening planted 12,156 trees in Detroit, and as of November 2017 has planted over 100,000 trees in the city since the organization's inception. The organization is involved in urban farming, working to maintain and improve urban farms in Detroit. Greening is also working to improve air quality. Its annual operating budget is approximately $3.8 million. Lionel Bradford is the president of The Greening of Detroit.

Programs

The organization works to coordinate and utilize vacant lots in Detroit for urban gardens and tree nurseries. Produce grown in the gardens is used to provide Detroit citizens with food, and trees grown in the converted vacant lots are replanted in the city. The conversion of the vacant lots also improves their appearance and serves to reduce vandalism.

At Romanowski Park in Detroit, The Greening of Detroit has partnered with area schools to educate students about nutrition and gardening during the growing season.

The group is working to use bioremediation techniques to restore contaminated land in the city, including an abandoned lot owned by Detroit Public Schools.

Detroit Conservation Corp
The organization's Detroit Conservation Corp. (DCC) workforce development program was started in 2006, in partnership with LaSalle Bank. This job training program was developed "to provide unemployed Detroiters with valuable job training and certification in the green industry." This partnership has continued with Bank of America (which acquired LaSalle Bank in 2007), which provided a $200,000 grant for the Detroit Conservation Corp (Formerly GreenWorks) program in 2012. The Detroit Conservation Corp program provides training for jobs in landscaping, agriculture and forestry, and upon completion of the program, participants are afforded an opportunity to take the Landscape Industry Certification exam.

Green Corps
The Greening of Detroit employs 200 students in their Green Corps program every summer. The employees are picked from a pool of 2,000 prospects, and the jobs pay minimum wage. In the process of their work to maintain various plantings in Detroit, Green Corps employees also learn about urban ecology.

Controversy
According to a report by Christine E. Carmichael, a researcher from the University of Michigan, during Greening’s tree planting in Detroit from 2011 to 2014, 24% of residents submitted a "no-tree request", more than 1,800 out of the 7,425 possible trees. Although they recognized the benefits of urban forestry, their personal experiences with the city government’s initial deforestation of the area after the 1967 Detroit riot led to distrust. The city government’s stated reason for deforesting the area was to control the spread of Dutch elm disease, including spraying DDT from helicopters over residential areas, but some African-American women interviewed by Carmichael viewed the deforestation and helicopters as increased surveillance of their communities in response to racial tensions, and consequently did not trust reforestation efforts. On the other hand, Greening representatives were under the impression that residents didn't recognize the importance of urban forestry. These differing perspectives on the city’s history through different lived experiences was described by Carmichael as “heritage narratives”.

Neighborhood residents also felt distrust towards Greening staff for not involving residents meaningfully enough in planning and decision making, as well as the fact that most of their volunteers were white and not from Detroit, a city with an African-American population of 83% in 2014. Additionally, residents felt that large trees already planted on city property weren’t properly cared for by the city, causing issues with safety and the appearance of neighborhoods, and that they would also be made responsible for the trees that Greening planted without their input. Residents participating in the report were more willing to accept the trees if they got to choose what kinds of trees would be planted.

In 2014, some residents also protested against Greening’s removal of playground structures and planting trees in southwest Detroit’s Bridgeview Park. Greening’s intent was to remove contaminants such as arsenic and lead with the new trees through phytoremediation, but residents voiced concerns such as that they didn’t get to give input on the project, especially as a Black community; digging health hazards; and a possible rodent population increase. They were also not informed of the contaminated soil by the time the project started, although the Detroit Public Schools district, which held ownership of the land, had previously erected a fence to prevent trespassing.

In response to Carmichael’s study, Greening expanded involvement of residents in planning and planting, as well as increased their number of community-engagement members from one person to four people, all of whom lived in Detroit.

See also 
 Hantz Woodlands
 Urban ecology
 Urban forestry
 Urban reforestation

References

Further reading 
 The Unreal Estate Guide to Detroit – Andrew Herscher. pp. 70–71.

External links
 

Urban forestry organizations
Organizations based in Detroit
1989 establishments in Michigan
Non-profit organizations based in Michigan
Environmental organizations based in Michigan
Forestry in the United States
1980s in Detroit